Akhand Jyoti (अखण्ड ज्योति) is a monthly magazine published from Mathura. It was started in 1938 by Pt. Shriram Sharma Acharya, the founder of All World Gayatri Pariwar (www.awgp.org). The main objective of the magazine is to promote scientific spirituality and the religion of 21st century, that is, scientific religion. The magazine is published in more than 10 languages and has more than a million subscribers all across the globe. Akhand Jyoti covers various aspects of life, such as, personality development, health management, familial management, societal development, social sustainability, nation building and scientific spirituality.

History
Inaugural issue of magazine was published on Vasant Panchami January 1938. Magazine was started in Hindi with a small circulation from Agra. Publication had to be stopped soon due to unavailability of raw material caused by World War II. It restarted in January 1940 with 500 copies. In 1941 it shifted to Mathura. Since then, it has continued without any interruption till date. Magazine now gets published in more than 10 languages.

Editors
First editor of magazine, Pt. Shriram Sharma Acharya, founder of All World Gayatri Pariwar, was a journalist and active participant of Indian freedom struggle. He had assisted Shri Krishnadatt Paliwal in Hindi daily Sainik where he had his own daily column Matta Pralap. He has authored more than three thousand books including bhashya of ancient Hindu scriptures.
In 1990, Bhagwati Devi Sharma, co-founder of All World Gayatri Pariwar, took over the editing work. Pranav Pandya, Director, Brahmavarchas Shodh Sansthan became chief editor in 1994 and still serving.

Notes

1938 establishments in India
Hindu magazines
Magazines established in 1938
Magazines about spirituality
Mathura
Monthly magazines published in India
Multilingual magazines